Wellenstein is a small town in southeastern Luxembourg. It is part of the canton of Remich, which is part of the district of Grevenmacher.

It used to be a commune with its administrative centre at Bech-Kleinmacher, until it was merged into Schengen (along with Burmerange) in 2011.

, the town of Wellenstein, had a population of 453.

On 25 October 2005, members of the pan-European organisation Cultural Village of Europe offered a declaration on village life to the European Commissioner of Agriculture and Rural Development Mariann Fischer Boel in Wellenstein. This "Declaration of Wellenstein" lists qualities of life in small communities.

Former commune
The former commune consisted of the villages:

 Bech-Kleinmacher
 Schwebsange
 Wellenstein

References

External links

Declaration of Wellenstein

Schengen, Luxembourg
Towns in Luxembourg
Former communes of Luxembourg